"Naked Eye" is a song by American alternative rock band Luscious Jackson, released as the first single from their second album, Fever In Fever Out (1996). It was released on CD and 12-inch, both of which feature three remixes and an instrumental version of the song as well as two non-LP tracks. The song peaked at  18 on the US Billboard Modern Rock Tracks chart and No. 36 on the Billboard Hot 100. To date it is the band's only top-40 hit in the United Kingdom, reaching No. 25 on the UK Singles Chart.

Background
In a 1997 interview with Billboard, singer Jill Cunniff explained that the song is about being emotionally naked, or honest, rather than naked as in without clothing.

Music video
The song's music video was inspired by the 1977 Luis Buñuel film That Obscure Object of Desire, which featured two actresses playing the same role. All four of the band's then members (Cunniff, Gabrielle Glaser, Kate Schellenbach and Vivian Trimble) portray the same character, a woman being escorted to a departing aircraft by her boyfriend. The character arrives in a Citroen CX car. Though the video is made to look like it takes place at an airport, it was filmed at New York's World Trade Center. The music video made its MTV debut on November 17, 1996.

Track listing
US maxi-CD single
 "Naked Eye" – 4:44
 "Banana's Box" – 3:10
 "Naked Eye" (Tony's Magic mix) – 5:13
 "Naked Eye" (20/20 mix) – 5:42
 "Naked Eye" (Totally Nude mix) – 5:13
 "Foster's Lover" – 2:42
 "Naked Eye" (Suntan Knee-Hi mix—instrumental) – 4:38

Charts

Weekly charts

Year-end charts

Release history

References

1996 singles
1996 songs
Capitol Records singles
Grand Royal singles
Luscious Jackson songs
Song recordings produced by Daniel Lanois
Songs written by Jill Cunniff